Linea Gialla  is a talk and debate television program produced by La7 and aired in Italy. 
The program is entirely devoted to people disappeared under mysterious circumstances.

Audience Share

References

External links
Web site

Italian sports television series
2013 Italian television series debuts
La7 original programming